Hartley is a historic village in Northumberland, England. It was a farming and later colliery village but today is part of Seaton Sluice. However it has given its name to the ward of Hartley which covers Seaton Sluice and New Hartley. The population of this ward at the 2011 Census was 4,923. Hartley is sometimes called Old Hartley to distinguish it from New Hartley.

The place-name 'Hartley' is first attested in the Pipe Rolls for 1167, where it appears as Hertelawa. The name means 'stag hill'.

References

External links

Villages in Northumberland
Populated coastal places in Northumberland